Zeiser is a surname. Notable people with the surname include:

Franz Zeiser, Swiss footballer
Matt Zeiser (1888–1942), American baseball pitcher
Rudolf Zeiser (1936–1993), German footballer

See also
Zeiger
Zeisel

German-language surnames